Club Atlético Pinares was a Honduran association football club, based in San Marcos de Colón in the department of Choluteca.

History
They won promotion to the  Liga de Ascenso in summer 2010.

Comayagua FC
In July 2012, the Honduran football arbitration court (Tribunal de Arbitraje de Fútbol) set due the accumulated debts of second division Hispano of Comayagua, which had reached almost one million lempiras (at the time 40,000 EUR / 31,500 GBP / US$51,000) to be paid within five days. This target proved out of scope for the club. Therefore management decided to dissolve Hispano and purchase the franchise of Atlético Pinares and rebrand it as Comayagua F.C.

Achievements
Liga de Ascenso
Winners (1): 2019–20 A

References

Defunct football clubs in Honduras
2012 disestablishments in Honduras
Association football clubs disestablished in 2012